The 2019 French Athletics Championships was the 131st edition of the national championship in outdoor track and field for France. It was held on 26–28 July at Stade Henri-Lux in Saint-Étienne. A total of 38 events (divided evenly between the sexes) were contested over the three-day competition.

Results

Men's

Women's

References

Results
Les Championnats de France 2019 from the Fédération française d'athlétisme

French Athletics Championships
Athletics Championships
French Athletics Championships
French Athletics Championships
Sport in Saint-Étienne